Provinces are constituent political entities of Zimbabwe. Zimbabwe currently has ten provinces, two of which are cities with provincial status. Zimbabwe is a unitary state, and its provinces exercise only the powers that the central government chooses to delegate. Provinces are divided into districts, which are divided into wards.

The Constitution of Zimbabwe delineates provincial governance and powers. After constitutional amendments in 1988, provinces were administered by a governor directly appointed by the President of Zimbabwe. Since the 2013 constitutional changes, there are technically no longer provincial governors, though in practice they remain in place as Ministers of State for Provincial Affairs. The 2013 Constitution also calls for the devolution of governmental powers and responsibilities where appropriate, though Zimbabwean opposition parties argue that the central government has yet to comply.

With the establishment of Company rule in Rhodesia in the 1890s, the country was divided into two provinces: Matabeleland in the west and Mashonaland in the east. Under British colonial rule as Southern Rhodesia, the colony was divided into five provinces. Later, the Rhodesian government expanded the number of provinces to seven: Manicaland, Matabeleland North and South, Mashonaland North and South, Midlands, and Victoria (today Masvingo). In the 1980s, Mashonaland North and South were reorganized to become three provinces (Mashonaland Central, East and West). The youngest provinces, Bulawayo and Harare, were created in 1997.

See also
Districts of Zimbabwe
Municipalities of Zimbabwe
List of provincial governors of Zimbabwe
List of Zimbabwean provinces by population
List of Zimbabwean provinces by Human Development Index
List of Zimbabwean presidential election results by province
ISO 3166-2:ZW

External links
 Map of Provinces of Zimbabwe - Statoids.org

References
5.Zimbabwe census2012 https://www.citypopulation.de/Zimbabwe-Cities.html

 
Subdivisions of Zimbabwe
Zimbabwe, Provinces
Zimbabwe 1
Provinces, Zimbabwe
Provinces of Zimbabwe-related lists
Zimbabwe geography-related lists